The 2018 Bangabandhu Gold Cup or simply 2018 Bangabandhu Cup was an international association football tournament organized by the Bangladesh Football Federation (BFF) as a tribute to Father of the Nation Bangabandhu Sheikh Mujibur Rahman. This was the 5th edition of the tournament with six teams competing from 1 to 12 October 2018.

Participating teams
Six nations competed in the tournament. BFF president Kazi Salahuddin has previously stated that the BFF wanted to get one team from each of the Asian Football Confederation's sub-confederations.  Afghanistan was also reported as a potential participant. All teams were the first teams except for the Philippines which brought their second team.

Draw
The draw took place on 1 September 2018 at the Le Méridien Dhaka Hotel in Dhaka. The six teams were drawn into two groups with three teams each for the group stage.

Venues
Matches were played in three venues. The Sylhet District Stadium in Sylhet hosted the group stage matches while the Cox's Bazar Stadium in Cox's Bazar hosted the semifinals. The Bangabandhu National Stadium in Dhaka was the venue for the final.

Officials

Referees
 Çarymyrat Kurbanow
 Mahmood Al-Majarafi
 Zaid Thamer Mohammed
 Shen Yinhao
 Mohamed Mizanur Rahman
 Mohammed Jalal Uddin

Assistant Referees

 Rawut Nakarit
 Loku Kasthotage Iran Udayakantha
 Aung Moe
 Sarar Asit Kumar
 Mohammad Shah Alam
 Mahmud Hasan Mamud

Group stage
Times listed are UTC+6:00.

Group A

Group B

Knockout stage
Times listed are UTC+6:00
In the knockout stage, extra-time and a penalty shoot-out was used to decide the winner if necessary.

Bracket

Semi-finals

Final

Goalscorers

Sponsorship
Local sports marketing company K-Sports bought the rights for this edition of the tournament and provided all the expenditures.

References

Bangabandhu Cup
October 2018 sports events in Asia
2018 in Bangladeshi football
2018 in Laotian football
2018–19 in Nepalese football
2018–19 in Palestinian football
2018 in Philippine football
2018 in Tajikistani football